Guestlogix Inc. is a Toronto-based technology company that provides onboard and off-board retail technology and merchandising systems. It was listed on the Toronto Stock Exchange, after being initially listed on the Toronto Venture Exchange in 2007. In February 2016, it entered creditor protection, and trading on the stock was suspended. It subsequently sold OpenJaw Technologies, a Dublin-based company it had purchased in 2014, to TravelSky, for $38 million. In July 2016, it sold its main Onboard business to a group led by Stornoway Portfolio Management. Under its new ownership, it re-launched in June 2017.

Overview 
In 2002, company founders Tom Douramakos and Brett Proud launched GuestLogix Inc. in Toronto, Ontario. The company operates regional offices in the United States, United Kingdom, Hong Kong and sales and support centers in Singapore and South Korea. Guestlogix was listed at 375th on the 2013 Deloitte's North America Technology Fast 500 and 39th on the 2013 Canadian Technology Fast 50.

Products 
 Point of Sale (POS) terminals and software
 Onboard storesoftware
 Reporting & analytics tools

References

External links
 

Companies based in Toronto
Companies established in 2002
2002 establishments in Ontario
Companies formerly listed on the Toronto Stock Exchange